Nancy O'Meara is an American dancer, choreographer and occasional actress.

O'Meara was born and raised in Boston, Massachusetts with a strong technical background, trained in all forms of dance. Her choreography is known to be fast-paced and powerful.

She has worked with some of the biggest names in showbusiness, including Jennifer Lopez, Kelly Clarkson, Britney Spears, Usher, Reba McEntire and Paula Abdul.

She has performed in a variety of specials including the Grammy Awards, the MTV Movie Awards, the American Music Awards, the Academy Awards, the Billboard Awards, and the Latin Grammy Awards and on television shows that include The Tonight Show, the Late Show with David Letterman and Chicago Hope.

She has choreographed and directed world tours for artists such as Hilary Duff ("Metamorphosis Tour," "Most Wanted Tour"), Jesse McCartney ("Beautiful Soul Tour"), Aly and AJ ("On The Ride Tour," "Aly and AJ Tour"), Vanessa Hudgens ("Baby V Tour"), Colbie Caillat ("Coco World Tour") and six world tours with Latin superstar Chayanne.

Her choreography can most recently be seen on the High School Musical concert tour, with Hayden Panettiere on PBS' A Capitol Fourth with Ashley Tisdale on NBC's Christmas at Rockefeller Center and on Disney's hit television series Hannah Montana. She has also done choreography and staging for American Idol, John Legend, Colbie Caillat and Charlie Puth.

She has also choreographed several music videos, including "Fly" for Hilary Duff, "Come Back To Me" for Vanessa Hudgens, "She's No You" for Jesse McCartney, "Potential Break Up Song" for Aly and AJ, "He Said, She Said" for Ashley Tisdale and "Monkey to The Man" for Elvis Costello.

Her feature film dance credits include Showgirls, for which she also acted as assistant choreographer, The Wedding Planner, 13 Going on 30 The Country Bears, Forrest Gump, Austin Powers in Goldmember and Clerks II.

She is a judge on Bravo's dance reality series Step It Up and Dance along with world-renowned choreographer Vincent Paterson and actress Elizabeth Berkley.  Her choreography and artistic direction is by BLOC Agency.

References

External links

American bloggers
American female dancers
American dancers
American film actresses
American television actresses
Living people
Participants in American reality television series
Artists from Boston
American women bloggers
Year of birth missing (living people)
21st-century American actresses